Michael Knox is the name of:

Michael D. Knox (born 1946), American psychologist and professor
Michael Knox (software businessman) (1961–2009), American software businessman and expert
Michael Knox (record producer), American record producer
Mike Knox (born 1978), American wrestler
Mickey Knox (1921-2013), actor who fell victim to the Hollywood blacklist